The Familiar Stranger is a 2001 American drama television film directed by Alan Metzger. It stars Margaret Colin and Jay O. Sanders.

Cast
Margaret Colin as Elizabeth 'Peach' Welsh
Jay O. Sanders as Patrick Hennessy Welsh / Timothy Michael Kingsbury
Will Estes as Ted Welsh
Aaron Ashmore as Chris Welsh
Michael Cera as Young Ted Welsh
Erik Knudsen as Young Chris Welsh

References

External links

2001 television films
2001 films
2001 drama films
American courtroom films
American drama television films
Films about dysfunctional families
Films scored by Craig Safan
Films shot in Ontario
Lifetime (TV network) films
Television courtroom dramas
Films directed by Alan Metzger
2000s English-language films
2000s American films